Yaginumena maculosa is a species of comb-footed spider in the family Theridiidae. It is found in China, Japan, and Korea, the Caucasus, and the Middle East.

References

Theridiidae
Spiders described in 2000
Arthropods of Japan
Arthropods of Korea
Arthropods of China